UFC on Fuel TV: Struve vs. Miocic (also known as UFC on Fuel TV 5) was a mixed martial arts event held by the Ultimate Fighting Championship on September 29, 2012, at Capital FM Arena in Nottingham, United Kingdom.

Background
Jörgen Kruth was expected to make his UFC debut against Fabio Maldonado at this event. However, Kruth dropped out of the fight to retire from mixed martial arts. As a result, Maldonado was pulled from the event and faced Glover Teixeira at UFC 153.

Pascal Krauss was expected to face promotional newcomer Gunnar Nelson at the event.  However, Krauss was forced out of the bout with an injury and Nelson was briefly linked to fight with Rich Attonito in a catchweight bout to be contested at 175 lb. However, Attonito had reservations about taking the short notice bout due to the weight cut requirements. DaMarques Johnson was slated to take on Nelson at catch weight 175 lb,
but DaMarques missed the weight by 8 lb, while Gunnar weighted at 175 lb. Gunnar agreed to fight DaMarques nevertheless.

Results

Bonus awards
Fighters were awarded $40,000 bonuses.
Fight of the Night: Stefan Struve vs. Stipe Miocic
Knockout of the Night: Brad Pickett
Submission of the Night: Matt Wiman

See also
List of UFC events
2012 in UFC

References

External links
Official UFC past events page
UFC events results at Sherdog.com
UFC Fans

UFC on Fuel TV
2012 in mixed martial arts
Mixed martial arts in the United Kingdom
Sport in Nottingham
2012 in English sport
2010s in Nottingham